Frederick LaForest (June 6, 1864 – April 27, 1908) was a Canadian politician. He served in the Legislative Assembly of New Brunswick as a member from Madawaska County.

References 

1864 births
1908 deaths
Independent New Brunswick MLAs
Politicians from Fredericton